Crucifixions and crucifixes have appeared in the arts and popular culture from before the era of the pagan Roman Empire. The crucifixion of Jesus has been depicted in a wide range of religious art since the 4th century CE, much of which has included the appearance of mournful onlookers, the Virgin Mary, angels, Pontius Pilate and even antisemeitc depictions of deicidal Jews. In more modern times, crucifixion has appeared in film and television as well as in fine art, and depictions of other historical crucifixions have appeared as well as the crucifixion of Christ. Modern art and culture have also seen the rise of images of crucifixion being used to make statements unconnected with Christian iconography, or even just used for shock value.

Art

Late Antiquity 

The earliest known artistic representations of crucifixion predate the Christian era, including Greek representations of mythical crucifixions inspired by the use of the punishment by the Persians.

The Alexamenos graffito, currently in the museum in the Palatine Hill, Rome, is a Roman graffito from the 2nd century CE which depicts a man worshiping a crucified donkey. This graffito, though apparently meant as an insult, is the earliest known pictorial representation of the crucifixion of Jesus. The text scrawled around the image reads Αλεξαμενος ϲεβετε θεον, which approximately translates to "Alexamenos worships God".

In the first three centuries of Early Christian art, the crucifixion was rarely depicted. Some engraved gems thought to be 2nd or 3rd century have survived, but the subject does not appear in the art of the Catacombs of Rome, and it is thought that at this period the image was restricted to heretical groups of Christians. The earliest Western images clearly originating in the mainstream of the church are 5th-century, including the scene on the doors of Santa Sabina, Rome. Constantine I forbade crucifixion as a method of execution, and early church leaders regarded crucifixion with horror, and thus, as an unfit subject for artistic portrayal.

The purported discovery of the True Cross by Constantine's mother, Helena, and the development of Golgotha as a site for pilgrimage, together with the dispersal of fragments of the relic across the Christian world, led to a change of attitude.  It was probably in Syria Palaestina that the image developed, and many of the earliest depictions are on the Monza ampullae, small metal flasks for holy oil, that were pilgrim's souvenirs from the Holy Land, as well as 5th-century ivory reliefs from Italy.  Prior to the Middle Ages, early Christians preferred to focus on the "triumphant" Christ, rather than a dying one, because the concept of the risen Christ was so central to their faith.  The plain cross became depicted, often as a "glorified" symbol, as the crux gemmata, covered with jewels, as many real early medieval processional crosses in goldsmith work were.

Eastern church 
 
Early depictions showed a living Christ, and tended to minimize the appearance of suffering, so as to draw attention to the positive message of resurrection and faith, rather than to the physical realities of execution. In the early history of the church in Ireland, important events were often commemorated by erecting pillars with elaborate crucifixes carved into them, such as where Saint Patrick, returning as a missionary bishop, saw the place he was held captive in his youth.

Early Byzantine depictions such as that in the Rabbula Gospels often show Christ flanked by Longinus and Stephaton with their spear and pole with vinegar. According to the gospels, the vinegar was offered just before Christ died, and the lance used just after, so the presence of the two flanking figures symbolizes the "double reality of God and man in Christ". In images from after the end of the Byzantine Iconoclasm, Christ is shown as dead, but his "body is undamaged and there is no expression of pain"; the Eastern church held that Christ's body was invulnerable. The "S"-shaped slumped body type was developed in the 11th century. These images were one of the complaints against Constantinople given by Rome in the Great Schism of 1054, although the Gero Cross in Cologne is probably nearly a century older.

Western church 

The earliest Western images of a dead Christ may be in the Utrecht Psalter, probably before 835.  Other early Western examples include the Gero Cross and the reverse of the Cross of Lothair, both from the end of the 10th century. The first of these is the earliest near life-size sculpted cross to survive, and in its large scale represents "suffering in its extreme physical consequences", a trend that was to continue in the West. Such figures, especially as roods, large painted or sculpted crucifixes hung high in front of the chancel of churches, became very important in Western art, providing a sharp contrast with Eastern Orthodox traditions, where the subject was never depicted in monumental sculpture, and increasingly rarely even in small Byzantine ivories. By contrast, an altar cross, almost always a crucifix, became compulsory in Western churches in the Middle Ages. That it should be a crucifix was first specified in the Roman Missal of 1570 and small wall-mounted crucifixes were increasingly popular in Catholic homes from the Counter-Reformation, if not before. The image of a crucifix that bled when mocked and struck by Jews also gained popularity during this time. 

As a broad generalization, the earliest depictions, before about 900, tended to show all three crosses (those of Jesus, the Good Thief and the Bad Thief), but later medieval depictions mostly showed just Jesus and his cross. From the Renaissance either type might be shown. The number of other figures shown depended on the size and medium of the work, but there was a similar trend for early depictions to show a number of figures, giving way in the High Middle Ages to just the Virgin Mary and Saint John the Evangelist, shown standing on either side of the cross, as in the Stabat Mater depictions, or sculpted or painted on panels at the end of each arm of a rood cross. 

The soldiers were less likely to be shown, but others of the party with Mary and John might be. Angels were often shown in the sky, and the Hand of God in some early depictions gave way to a small figure of God the Father in the heavens in some later ones, those these were always in the minority. Other elements that might be included were the sun and moon (evoking the darkening of the heavens at the moment of Christ's death), and Ecclesia and Synagoga. There were also representations of the alleged aggressors, including depictions of Jews mocking, glaring, slapping, and ultimately crucifying Jesus. Although according to the Gospel accounts his clothing was removed from Jesus before his crucifixion, most artists have thought it proper to represent his lower body as draped in some way. In one type of sculpted crucifix, of which the Volto Santo in Lucca is the classic example, Christ continued to wear the long collobium robe of the Rabbula Gospels.

In the Gothic period more elaborate narrative depictions developed, including many extra figures of Mary Magdalene, disciples, especially The Three Marys behind the Virgin Mary, soldiers often including an officer on a horse, and angels in the sky. The moment when Longinus the centurion pierces Christ with his spear (the "Holy Lance") is often shown, and the blood and water spurting from Christ's side is often caught in a chalice held by an angel. In larger images the other two crosses might return, but most often not. In some works donor portraits were included in the scene. Such depictions begin in the late 12th century, and become common where space allows in the 13th century.

Related scenes such as the Deposition of Christ, Entombment of Christ and Nailing of Christ to the Cross developed.  In the Late Middle Ages, increasingly intense and realistic representations of suffering were shown, paired with increasingly grotesque and malicious depictions of Pontius Pilate and the allegedly murderous Jews, reflecting the development of highly emotional andachtsbilder subjects and devotional trends such as German mysticism; some, like the Throne of Mercy, Man of Sorrows and Pietà, related to the Crucifixion.  The same trend affected the depiction of other figures, notably in the "Swoon of the Virgin", who is very commonly shown fainting in paintings of between 1300 and 1500, though this depiction was attacked by theologians in the 16th century, and became unusual.  After typically more tranquil depictions during the Italian Renaissance—though not its Northern equivalent, which produced works such as the Isenheim Altarpiece—there was a return to intense emotionalism in the Baroque, in works such as Peter Paul Rubens's Elevation of the Cross.

The scene always formed part of a cycle of images of the Life of Christ after about 600 (though it is noticeably absent before) and usually in one of the Life of the Virgin; the presence of Saint John made it a common subject for altarpieces in churches dedicated to him. From the late Middle Ages various new contexts for images were devised, from such large scale monuments as the "calvaire" of Brittany and the Sacri Monti of Piedmont and Lombardy to the thousands of small wayside shrines found in many parts of Catholic Europe, and the Stations of the Cross in the majority of Catholic churches.

Modern art 

Crucifixion has appeared repeatedly as a theme in many forms of modern art.

The surrealist Salvador Dalí painted Crucifixion (Corpus Hypercubus), representing the cross as a hypercube. Fiona Macdonald describes the 1954 painting as showing a classical pose of Christ superimposed on a mathematical representation of the fourth dimension that is both unseeable and spiritual; Gary Bolyer assesses it as "one of the most beautiful works of the modern era." The sculpture Construction (Crucifixion): Homage to Mondrian, by Barbara Hepworth, stands on the grounds of Winchester Cathedral. Porfirio DiDonna's abstract Crucifixion is one of a number of religious works he painted in the 1960s, "blending the artist's devotion to the liturgy and his commitment to painting". The "Welsh Window", given to the 16th Street Baptist Church after it was bombed by four Ku Klux Klansmen in 1963, is a work of support and solidarity. The stained glass window depicts a black man, arms outstretched, reminiscent of the crucifixion of Jesus; it was sculpted by John Petts, who also initiated a campaign in Wales to raise money to help rebuild the church.

Photographer Robert Mapplethorpe's 1975 self-portrait shows the artist, nude and smiling, posed as if crucified. The 1983 painting Crucifixion, by Nabil Kanso, employs a perspective that places the viewer behind Christ's cross. In 1987 photographer Andres Serrano created Piss Christ, a controversial photograph that shows a small plastic crucifix submerged in a glass of the artist's urine, in which Serrano intended to depict sympathetically the abuse of Jesus by his executioners. In the 1990s, Marcus Reichert painted a series of crucifixions, though he did not identify the figure as Christ, but as a representation of human suffering.

Other artists have used crucifixion imagery as a form of protest. In 1974, Chris Burden had himself crucified to a Volkswagen in Trans-Fixed. Robert Cenedella painted a crucified Santa Claus as a protest against Christmas commercialization, displayed in the window of New York's Art Students League in December 1997. In August 2000, performance artist Sebastian Horsley had himself crucified without the use of any analgesics.

Popular art 
Crucifixion in popular art, as with modern art, is sometimes used for its shock value. For example, a World War I Liberty bond poster by Fernando Amorsolo depicts a German soldier nailing an American soldier, his arms outspread, to the trunk of a tree. Crucifixion imagery is also used to make points in political cartoons. An image of a skinhead being crucified is a popular symbol among the skinhead subculture, and it is used to convey a sense of societal alienation or persecution against the subculture.

Graphic novels 

Crucifixion figures prominently in graphic novels from many cultures throughout the world. In Western comic books, characters in cruciform are seen more often than actual crucifixions. For example, Animal Man's fifth issue earned an Eisner Award nomination in 1989 for its "The Coyote Gospel", the story of Crafty, a thinly-disguised Wile E. Coyote (of the Road Runner cartoons) and the depiction at the culmination of the issue of his dead body in cruciform. Superman, often seen as a Christ figure, has also been crucified, as well as being shown in cruciform.

Crucifixions and crucifixes have appeared repeatedly in Japanese manga and anime. In manga iconography, crucifixes serve two purposes: as death symbols, and as symbols of justice. Scholars such as Michael Broderick and Susan J. Napier argue that Japanese readers associate crucifixion imagery with apocalyptic themes, and trace this symbolism to Japanese secular views of the bombings of Hiroshima and Nagasaki, rather than to religious faith. Producers of anime generally deny any religious motivation for depiction of crucifixion. Concern that Westerners may find these portrayals of crucifixion offensive has led some distributors and localization studios to remove crucifixion imagery from manga such as Fullmetal Alchemist and anime such as Sailor Moon.

Passion plays 

Passion plays are dramatic presentations of the trial and crucifixion of Jesus. They originated as expressions of devotion in the Middle Ages. In modern times, critics have said that some performances are antisemitic, portraying Jews as Jesus's murderous and hateful antagonist.

Film and television

Film 
Numerous movies have been produced which depict the crucifixion of Jesus. Some of these movies depict the crucifixion in its traditional sectarian form, while others intend to show a more historically accurate account. For example, Ben-Hur (1959), was probably the first movie to depict the nails being driven through Jesus' wrists, rather than his palms. Mel Gibson's controversial The Passion of the Christ (2004) depicted an extreme level of violence, but showed the nails being driven into Jesus' palms, as is traditional, with ropes supporting the wrists.

Although crucifixion imagery is common, few films depict actual crucifixion outside of a Christian context. Spartacus (1960) depicts the mass crucifixions of rebellious slaves along the Appian Way after the Third Servile War. The character Big Bob is crucified by cannibals in Wes Craven's horror exploitation film The Hills Have Eyes (1977) as well as its 2006 remake. Conan the Barbarian (1982) depicts the protagonist being crucified on the Tree of Woe.

The 1979 British comedy film Monty Python's Life of Brian ends with a comical sequence in which several of the cast, including Brian, are crucified by the Romans. The film ends with them all singing the song "Always Look on the Bright Side of Life". In this sequence, the characters are not nailed to the crosses, but tied at the wrists to the crossbar, and are standing on smaller crosspieces at foot level.

In the 2010 film Legion, one of the diner patrons is found crucified upside down and covered with huge boils.

Television 
Simulated crucifixions have been performed in professional wrestling. On the December 7, 1998, edition of WWF Monday Night Raw, professional wrestling character The Undertaker crucified Steve Austin. On October 26, 1996, in Extreme Championship Wrestling, Raven, during a feud with The Sandman, instructed his Raven's Nest to crucify Sandman.

Other television performers have used crucifixion to make a point. The Australian comedian John Safran had himself crucified in the Philippines as part of a Good Friday crucifixion ritual for the Australian Broadcasting Corporation show, John Safran's Race Relations (2009). Singer Robbie Williams performed a stunt on an April 2006 Easter Sunday show shown on the UK television channel Channel 4, in which he was affixed to a cross and pierced with needles.

The HBO television series Rome (2005–2007) contained several depictions of crucifixion, as it was a common torture method during the historical period the show takes place in.

In the 2010 Starz television series Spartacus: Blood and Sand, Segovax, a slave recruit to the gladiatorial ludus of Lentulus Batiatus, attempts to assassinate Spartacus in the ludus washrooms and is crucified for doing so "after being parted from his cock".

Crucifixion has been depicted in the television series Xena: Warrior Princess (1995–2001), where its depiction has been cited in feminist studies as illustrating violent and misogynist tendencies within a messianic paradigm.

In the History Channel series "Vikings", the character Æthelstan, after being captured by the Saxons and named an apostate, is shown wearing a crown of thorns and being nailed to a cross. After the cross is raised he is taken down at the order of King Ecbert.

The Japanese science fiction series Neon Genesis Evangelion features crucifixion as a recurring motif.

During the Pilot episode of Smallville, Clark Kent was tied up (only his underwear and a red S painted on his chest) on a scarecrow pole, resembling very much like a cross, and subdued with a Kryptonite necklace.

Video games
In Danganronpa Another Episode: Ultra Despair Girls, one of the women gets ultimately crucified on a cross with screws as Monokuma plays with the marionette strings.

Music

Classical music 

Famous depictions of crucifixion in classical music include the St John Passion and St Matthew Passion by Johann Sebastian Bach, and Giovanni Battista Pergolesi's setting of Stabat Mater. Notable recent settings include the St. Luke Passion (1965) by Polish composer Krzysztof Penderecki and the St. John Passion (1982) by Estonian composer Arvo Pärt. The 2000 work, La Pasión según San Marcos (St. Mark Passion) by Argentinian Jewish composer Osvaldo Golijov, was named one of the top classical compositions of the decade for its fusion of traditional passion motifs with Afro-Cuban, tango, Capoeira, and Kaddish themes.

Crucifixion has figured prominently in Easter cantatas, oratorios, and requiems. The third section of a full mass, the Credo, contains the following passage at its climax: "Crucifixus etiam pro nobis sub Pontio Pilato, passus et sepultus est," which means "And was crucified also for us under Pontius Pilate; he suffered and was buried." This passage was sometimes set to music separately as a Crucifixus, the most famous example being that of Antonio Lotti for eight voices.

The seven utterances of Jesus while on the Cross, gathered from the four gospels, have inspired many musical compositions, from Heinrich Schütz in 1645 to Ruth Zechlin in 1996, with the best known being Joseph Haydn's ''composition, written in 1787.

Depictions of crucifixion outside the Christian context are rare. One of the few examples is in Ernest Reyer's opera Salammbô (1890).

Popular music 
The 1970 rock opera Jesus Christ Superstar by Tim Rice and Andrew Lloyd Webber ends with Jesus' crucifixion.

The cover art of Tupac Shakur's album The Don Killuminati: The 7 Day Theory features an image of Tupac being crucified on a cross. He stated that the image was not a mockery of Christ; rather, it showed how he was being "crucified" by the media. Multiple Marilyn Manson videos such as "I Don't Like The Drugs But The Drugs Like Me" and "Coma White" feature crucifixion imagery, often oddly staged in surreal modern or near modern-day settings. The Norwegian black metal band Gorgoroth had several people on stage affixed to crosses to give the appearance of crucifixion at a now infamous concert in Kraków, and repeated this act in the music video for "Carving a Giant." In 2006, singer Madonna opened a concert held near Vatican City with a mock crucifixion, complete with a crown of thorns.

Novels
Sue Monk Kidd's 2020 novel The Book of Longings, tells the fictional story of Ana, an educated woman who marries Jesus. D. G. Martin says the novel "reconstructs the crucifixion experience in a way more horrible and poignant than any of the four Gospels."

See also 
 Christian symbolism
 Depiction of Jesus
 Descent from the Cross
 Stations of the Cross
 Religious images in Christian theology

Notes

References 
 Schiller, Gertrud, Iconography of Christian Art, Vol. II,1972 (English translation from German), Lund Humphries, London,

External links 

 Age of spirituality : late antique and early Christian art, third to seventh century from The Metropolitan Museum of Art

Visual arts by subject
Death in art
Crucifixion
Christian art about death
 
Christian iconography